Slow Revival is the seventh album by contemporary Christian artist Bryan Duncan. Released on Myrrh Records in 1994, the album was nominated in the Best Contemporary Album category at the 26th GMA Dove Awards.

Background and release
Duncan said of the album's message: "(People) have to understand that even though they might not be where they would like to be in their spirituality, they should not be discouraged or give up." According to Duncan, the theme was something he was personally dealing with at the time of the album's recording, and that he found peace during the process. Slow Revival, released in 1994, peaked at number five on the Billboard Top Contemporary Christian chart. Three singles from the album - "Traces of Heaven", "Things Are Gonna Change", and "United We Stand" - reached number one on the Christian radio charts. In a review of the album, Mike Joyce of The Washington Post wrote that Duncan's singing "is far more colorful on the funk tracks, particularly 'Wheels of a Good Thing,' but even here his evangelical fervor is tempered by his sharp pop instincts." 
Slow Revival was nominated in the Best Contemporary Album category at the 26th GMA Dove Awards.

Promotion
To support the album, Duncan embarked on the Slow Revival Tour with opening acts Rebecca St. James and Bob Carlisle. Concerts featured Duncan joining each artist on stage for a couple of songs during their respective sets. The three singers performed together for each show's finale. In a review of the tour stop in Nashville, Deborah Evans Price of Billboard called it "a high-octane concert performance with a dash of late-night talk show zaniness." She noted that a NHK news crew filmed a segment of the show for a piece to air in Japan on the growing popularity at the time of contemporary Christian music.

Track listing

Personnel 
 Sources:

Musicians

 Bryan Duncan – lead vocals 
 Michael Omartian – keyboards and track arrangements (1, 2, 5, 6, 9)
 Robbie Buchanan – keyboards and track arrangements (3, 10)
 Peter Wolf – keyboards and track arrangements (4, 7, 8) 
 Randy Lee – additional keyboards
 Alan Pasqua – Hammond B3 organ, additional keyboards
 Dann Huff – guitars 
 Gary Chapman – guitars 
 Cedric Lee – bass 
 John Peano – bass
 Neil Stubenhaus – bass 
 Curt Bisquera – drums and percussion
 Eric Darken – drums and percussion
 Steve Latination – drums and percussion
 John Robinson – drums and percussion 
 Carlos Vega – drums and percussion 
 David Lhebo – saxophones 
 Dennis Good – trombone 
 John Darnall – string arrangements 
 The Nashville String Machine – strings
 Ann Bailey – backing vocals 
 Darrell Brown – backing vocals 
 Tony Gillis – backing vocals 
 Shaun Murphy – backing vocals 
 David Pack – backing vocals 
 Carol Perry – backing vocals
 Lori Perry – backing vocals
 Sharon Perry – backing vocals
 Dan Posthuma – backing vocals
 Anointed (Steve Crawford, Da'dra Crawford, Mary Tiller and Nee-C Walls) – guest vocals on "United We Stand" 

Production

 Ray Ware – executive producer
 Dan Posthuma – producer
 Michael Omartian – rhythm track co-producer (5, 6, 9)
 Mike Mierau – engineer
 Doug Bieden – additional engineer
 Terry Christian – additional engineer
 Bryan Davis – additional engineer
 Paul Ericksen – additional engineer
 Dan Garcia – additional engineer
 S. Husky Hoskulds – additional engineer
 Dennis "DJ" Johnson – additional engineer
 Ross Pallone – additional engineer
 Doug Sarrett – additional engineer
 Bert Stevens – additional engineer
 Aaron Swihart – additional engineer
 Anthony Thomas – additional engineer
 Tejas Recording (Nashville, Tennessee) – recording location
 OmniSound (Nashville, Tennessee) – recording location
 3319 Studio (Nashville, Tennessee) – recording location
 Quad Studios (Nashville, Tennessee) – recording location
 Bunny Hop Studios (Sherman Oaks, California) – recording location
 Shelter Studio (Riverside, California) – recording location
 Hollywood Sound (Hollywood, California) – recording location
 Embassy Studios (Los Angeles, California) – recording location
 Pack's Place (Los Angeles, California) – recording location
 Eric "Smpte" Slaughter – technical credit
 Bill Schnee – mixing at Schnee Studio (North Hollywood, California)
 Bob Ludwig – mastering at Gateway Mastering (Portland, Maine)
 Diana Barnes – art direction
 Franke Design Company – design
 F. Scott Schafer – photography

Charts

References

External links
 

1994 albums
Bryan Duncan albums
albums produced by Michael Omartian